John Phipps may refer to:

 John Lewis Phipps (1801–1870), British businessman and MP
 John Shaffer Phipps (1874–1958), American lawyer and businessman